Imperium is an album by the American rock band Blouse, released in 2013.

References

2013 albums